is a Japanese road bicycle racer, who currently rides for the cycling team .

Career
Born in Shimizu, Shizuoka, Sano begin his career in 2005 with the Japanese continental team Bridgestone Anchor. In the 2008 season, he changed over to Team Nippo–Endeka, based in San Marino, with which he placed fourth at the Japanese National Road Race Championships.
The following year, for the 28th Asian Cycling Championships held in Tenggarong, inn Borneo, Indonesia, Sano ranked sixth in the individual time trial and fifth in the road race.

In 2010, Sano rode with Team Nippo, ranking seventh in the general classification of the Tour of Japan, third in the general classification of the Vuelta Ciclista a León, in Spain, third overall in the Tour de Kumano and second overall in the Tour de Hokkaido, both in Japan.

In 2012, he finished second in the Japanese National Time Trial Championships. Four months later, he was third in the Tour de Guadeloupe general classification. He joined  for the 2013 season.

In June 2014, he won the Japanese National Road Race Championships for the first time.

Major results

2008
 4th Road race, National Road Championships
2009
 Asian Road Championships
5th Road race
6th Individual time trial
 5th Kumamoto International Road Race
 6th Overall Tour de Okinawa
 8th Overall Tour of Japan
2010
 2nd Overall Tour de Hokkaido
 3rd Overall Vuelta Ciclista a León
 3rd Overall Tour de Okinawa
 4th Road race, National Road Championships
 5th Kumamoto International Road Race
 7th Overall Tour of Japan
 10th Overall Tour de Kumano
1st Stage 2
2011
 2nd Time trial, National Road Championships
 3rd Overall Tour de Taiwan
 3rd Overall Tour de Okinawa
 3rd Japan Cup
 4th Overall Tour de Hokkaido
1st Stage 3
2012
 2nd Time trial, National Road Championships
 3rd Overall Tour de Guadeloupe
 7th Overall Tour de Kumano
 7th Tour de Okinawa
 9th Overall Tour of Japan
2014
 National Road Championships
1st  Road race
2nd Time trial
 8th Overall Tour de Hokkaido
2015
 5th Time trial, Asian Road Championships
2016
 2nd Time trial, National Road Championships
2017
 1st Tour de Okinawa
 2nd Time trial, National Road Championships
2018
 1st Stage 3 Tour de Kumano
 2nd Road race, National Road Championships
2019
 5th Overall Ronda Pilipinas

References

External links

Japanese male cyclists
Tour de Guadeloupe cyclists
Sportspeople from Shizuoka Prefecture
People from Shimizu, Shizuoka
1982 births
Living people